was a village located in Takaoka District, Kōchi Prefecture, Japan.

As of 2003, the village had an estimated population of 4,305 and a density of 64.49 persons per km². The total area was 66.75 km².

On February 1, 2005, Hayama, along with the village of Higashitsuno (also from Takaoka District), was merged to create the town of Tsuno and no longer exists as an independent municipality.

External links
 Official website of Tsuno 

Dissolved municipalities of Kōchi Prefecture